Genius Cru are a UK garage crew from London. They are best known for the song "Boom Selection" which reached No. 12 on the UK Singles Chart and No. 1 on the UK Dance Singles Chart in early 2001. Later the same year, they scored another top 40 hit with "Course Bruv".

Discography

Singles
"Waiting" (1999), Kronik
Angel EP (2000), G Records
"Boom Selection" (2000), Kronik/Incentive - UK #12
"Course Bruv" (2001), Incentive - UK #39
"Waiting 2013" (2013), Genius Beats

References

External links

Musical groups established in 1998
UK garage groups
English electronic music groups
English hip hop groups
Musical groups from London
Incentive Records artists